Patrick Michael O'Regan (born 8 October 1958) is a prelate of the Catholic Church. He has been the Roman Catholic Archbishop of Adelaide since 25 May 2020. Prior to that, he had been the Bishop of Sale since 2015.

On 19 March 2020, Pope Francis announced that Bishop O'Regan would become the 12th Archbishop of Adelaide.

Early years and background

Educated at St Joseph's Primary School, Perthville and St Stanislaus' College, Bathurst, O'Regan commenced study for the priesthood at St Columba College,  and later at St Patrick's College. During his semester breaks it was reported that he pulled beers at the Majellan Club, carted feed and cut cauliflowers in the local market gardens.

During 1994 and 1995 O'Regan commenced higher studies at the Institut Catholique, Paris. In 2008 he was appointed as Diocesan Administrator in the Diocese of Bathurst; promoted to Diocesan Chancellor to 2009; to the Dean of the Cathedral in 2010; and concurrently as the Vicar General in 2012.

Bishop of Sale
In December 2014 it was announced that Pope Francis had appointed O'Regan as the Bishop of Sale, replacing Christopher Prowse, who became the Archbishop of Canberra-Goulburn. O'Regan was consecrated and installed as Bishop on 26 February 2015, by Archbishop Denis Hart.

Archbishop of Adelaide
On 19 March 2020 it was announced that Pope Francis had appointed O'Regan as the Archbishop of Adelaide. He was installed as Archbishop of Adelaide on 25 May 2020 at a small ceremony, due to COVID-19 restrictions, at St Francis Xavier's Cathedral, Adelaide, South Australia.

See also

 Roman Catholicism in Australia

References

1958 births
Living people
20th-century Roman Catholic priests
Sacramental theologians
People from New South Wales
Institut Catholique de Paris alumni
Roman Catholic archbishops of Adelaide
21st-century Roman Catholic archbishops in Australia